The Valea Albă is a left tributary of the Valea Rea in Romania. It discharges into the Valea Rea near Boinești.

References

Rivers of Romania
Rivers of Satu Mare County